Aoi Masuda (増田葵, Masuda Aoi, born 20 June 1996) is a Japanese swimmer. She competed in the women's 4 × 200 metre freestyle relay at the 2020 Summer Olympics.

References

External links
 

1996 births
Living people
Japanese female freestyle swimmers
Olympic swimmers of Japan
Swimmers at the 2020 Summer Olympics
People from Kurashiki
Sportspeople from Okayama Prefecture
21st-century Japanese women